Alireza Ghasemi Farzad (born 1966 in Hamadan) is an Iranian conservative politician who currently serves as the governor of Hamadan Province.

References

1966 births
Living people
People from Hamadan
Governors of Hamadan Province